Alden is an unincorporated community in western Caddo County, Oklahoma, United States.

References

Unincorporated communities in Caddo County, Oklahoma
Unincorporated communities in Oklahoma